Ferenciek tere is a station on the M3 (North-South) line of the Budapest Metro located under the eponymous square in the Downtown. It is an important junction, as several bus lines from Buda pass through or terminate here. It is also the station closest to the geographical city centre of Budapest. The station's name was Felszabadulás tér ("Liberation" Square) before 1990.

The station was opened on 31 December 1976 as part of the inaugural section of Line M3 between Deák Ferenc tér and Nagyvárad tér.

Connections
Bus: 5, 7, 8E, 15, 108E, 110, 112, 115, 133E
Tram: 2, 2B, 2M

References
Budapest City Atlas, Dimap-Szarvas, Budapest, 2011, 

M3 (Budapest Metro) stations
Railway stations opened in 1976